The College of Agricultural and Environmental Sciences (Ag&E) is one of four colleges of the University of California, Davis. Established in 1922, it offers degrees in 27 undergraduate majors and thirty-three graduate groups (i.e. M.S. and Ph.D.). As of January 2014, the College has been overseen by Dean Helene Dillard.

Divisions
The college is organized into three divisions, which are then further subdivided into 22 departments, as follows:

Agricultural Sciences Division
Animal Science
Biological and Agricultural engineering
Entomology
Nematology
Plant pathology
Plant sciences
Agronomy and Range science
Environmental horticulture
Pomology
Vegetable crops
Viticulture and Enology

Environmental Sciences Division
Environmental science and Policy
Environmental toxicology
Founded in 1968, this department offered the first undergraduate degree in environmental toxicology at any university.
Landscape Architecture
Land, Air and Water Resources
Wildlife, Fish, and Conservation Biology
This department was started in the early 1970s under the name Department of Wildlife and Fisheries. It was given its current name in the mid-1980s as conservation was becoming an increasingly popular societal issue. Department faculty, cooperative extension specialists, postdoctoral researchers, and graduate students training and studying in fields including ecology, wildlife management, conservation biology, animal behavior, evolution, and population biology. It is home of the Museum of Wildlife and Fish Biology, which houses 60,000 specimens of vertebrates primarily used for teaching and research. Undergraduates may choose the wildlife, fish, and conservation biology major and take a Bachelor of Science.
Human Sciences Division
Managerial Economics (formally Agricultural and Resource Economics)
Environmental Design
Food Science and Technology
Human and Community Development
Nutrition
Textiles and Clothing

References

External links
Website

Agricultural and Environmental Sciences
Educational institutions established in 1922
Agriculture in California
Agricultural universities and colleges in the United States
1922 establishments in California